Surachai Jaturapattarapong or the nickname "Nguan" (born November 20, 1969) is a Thai Football manager and former  football player. He is a famous midfielder who scored 7 goals for the national team. He played for the national team between 1997-2001. Now he works for BG Pathum United as club director.

Club career
From 1991 to 1996 Surachai played at the Thai Farmers Bank F.C. It was the most successful era of his active career. He won with a total of three club championships in 1994 and 1995 and the AFC Champions League. In 1998, he joined the club and went to the Stock Exchange of Thailand where he played until the end of 2000. He then moved to Singapore in the S League to Gombak United. The club withdrew from the league in 2002 and Surachai went back to Home United. There he played until 2005, rather he ended his club career.

International career
His international career began already in the U-14 Thailand. About the U-16 and U-19, he made it to the seniors, where in 1991 he graduated from his first game. In the finals of the ASEAN Football Championship 2001 Surachai made his last game for the national team. On 23 February 2005, he was given a farewell by the Thai Football Association game. In this game a Thai Allstar selection ran against his last club Home United. The game was broadcast nationwide on television. The total revenue around the game, a total of 1.2 million baht went to Surachai. With the Thailand national football team, he won four gold medals at the Southeast Asian Games, and won three times in succession, the ASEAN Football Championship. He took 1992, 1996 and 2000 participated in the Asian Cup

International goals

Managerial statistics

Honours

Player
Thailand
 Sea Games  Winner (4); 1993, 1995, 1997, 1999 
 Runner-Up (1); 1991
 ASEAN Football Championship  Winner; 1996, 2000, 2002
 Asian Games 4th (1); 1998
 King's Cup  Winner (2); 1994, 2000,

Clubs
 Thai Farmer Bank
 AFC Champions League  Champions (2); 1994, 1995
 Thai League T1  Champions (4); 1991, 1992, 1993, 1995
 Queen's Cup  Champions (2); 1994, 1995
 Afro-Asian Club Championship  Champions (1); 1994

 Home United
 S.League  Champions (1); 2003
 Singapore Cup  Champions (1); 2003, 2005

Awards
S.League Player of the Year Award  (1); 2004

Manager
Clubs

 Bangkok Glass
 Thai Super Cup  Winner (1); 2009
 Singapore Cup Runner-up (1); 2009
 Queen's Cup  Winner (1); 2010

References

1969 births
Living people
Surachai Jaturapattarapong
Surachai Jaturapattarapong
Surachai Jaturapattarapong
1992 AFC Asian Cup players
1996 AFC Asian Cup players
2000 AFC Asian Cup players
Surachai Jaturapattarapong
Surachai Jaturapattarapong
Gombak United FC players
Home United FC players
Expatriate footballers in Singapore
Thai expatriate sportspeople in Singapore
Thai expatriate footballers
Singapore Premier League players
Surachai Jaturapattarapong
Surachai Jaturapattarapong
Surachai Jaturapattarapong
Thailand national football team managers
Footballers at the 1998 Asian Games
Surachai Jaturapattarapong
Southeast Asian Games medalists in football
Association football midfielders
Competitors at the 1991 Southeast Asian Games
Competitors at the 1993 Southeast Asian Games
Competitors at the 1995 Southeast Asian Games
Competitors at the 1997 Southeast Asian Games
Competitors at the 1999 Southeast Asian Games
Surachai Jaturapattarapong